Frank Edward Boland (July 31, 1873 – January 3, 1913), James Paul Boland (August 20, 1882 – December 19, 1967) and Joseph John Boland (May 27, 1879 – September 12, 1964) were early aircraft designers from Rahway, New Jersey who started the Boland Airplane and Motor Company.

Biographies
They were the children of James Francis Boland (1834–1913) and Catherine Julia Kavanaugh (1843–1925).

They had set records for bicycle racing in 1898. 
In 1904, Frank and Joseph, started a business servicing bicycles, motorcycles, and automobiles in Rahway.

Frank Boland was killed in on January 23, 1913, during an exhibition flight in Trinidad. They worked with tailless aircraft that were early predecessors of flying wings. A scale model of their plane is in the Smithsonian.

In 1914, the Aeromarine Plane and Motor Company of Avondale, New Jersey, took over the manufacturing rights of all Boland airplanes and engines.

Legacy
E.T. Wooldridge writes: "The Boland brothers were a relatively small, but extraordinary, part of early aviation history in the United States. Frank supplied the enthusiasm, ingenuity, and self-taught flying ability; Joseph provided the mechanical genius to transform ideas into some tangible, workable form; and James had the business sense so often lacking in ventures of that sort."

During the 1997-1998 and 1998-1999 contest years, the Boland Brothers team, composed of a great-grand-nephew and great-great-grandnephew of the Boland brothers, competed in the National Association of Rocketry at the regional and national levels, setting no fewer than two US model rocket performance records, and finishing in third place overall for the 1998-1999 season.

Aircraft 
 Boland 1911 Tailless Biplane
 Boland 1911 Conventional Biplane
 Boland 1912 Tailless Biplane
 Boland 1913 Tailless Flying Boat
 Boland 1914 Monoplane Flying Boat
 Boland 1914 Biplane Flying Boat

Engines 
 Boland V-8

See also
Wright brothers
Wittemann brothers
Voisin brothers

References

People from Rahway, New Jersey
Members of the Early Birds of Aviation